Tareq Ayyoub (also Romanized Tareq Ayoub, Tariq Ayoub, Tarek Ayoub, Tarik Ayub, 1968 - 8 April 2003) was an Arab television reporter of Palestinian nationality, employed by Al Jazeera, and previously by Fox News. Ayyoub was killed in 2003 when two missiles, fired from by an American ground-attack aircraft, struck the Baghdad headquarters of the Al Jazeera Satellite Channel during the 2003 US-led Invasion of Iraq. The Al Jazeera station was clearly marked as a media centre, and the US military had been informed of its location in February.

Biography
Born in Kuwait in 1968, Ayyoub received his Masters in English from Calicut University. Beginning in 1998, he covered the domestic and international politics of Jordan for the English-language Jordan Times.

Death

On the morning of 8 April 2003, Ayyoub, along with his second cameraman, an Iraqi named Zuheir, was covering a pitched battle between the American and Iraqi troops from the roof of Al-Jazeera's Baghdad office. At approximately 7:45 a.m., an American A-10 Warthog ground-attack aircraft turned toward Al-Jazeera's office and began to descend upon it. Maher Abdullah, the station's  Baghdad correspondent,  witnessed the A-10's attack run and gave the following description, "The plane was flying so low that those of us downstairs thought it would land – that's how close it was. We actually heard the rocket being launched. It was a direct hit – the missile actually exploded against our electrical generator, and Tareq died almost at once, Zuheir was injured."

Context
On the same day, the Abu Dhabi satellite station was hit by 'Army Fire' in a different section of Baghdad, and an American tank fired shells at Palestine Hotel, killing journalists Taras Protsyuk of Reuters and Jose Couso of the Spanish television station, Telecinco.

Reaction
Many of the Arab reporters for Al Jazeera saw this as an intentional attack on their personnel, but the United States claimed later that day that the death had been an accident, and that hostile fire had been seen originating from the Al Jazeera headquarters.

See also
Ali Hassan al-Jaber

Notes

External links
 Al-Jazeera 'hit by missile' BBC News,  8 April 2003.
  Robert Fisk, SF Bay Guardian. 26 April 2003.
 IFJ calls for re-opening of investigation into Ayyoub's death, IFEX, 24 November 2005.
 The war on al-Jazeera Comment by Dima Tareq Tahboub, the widow of Tareq Ayyoub, The Guardian, 4 October 2003
  Iraq memorial: Tariq Ayoub

1968 births
2003 deaths
Journalists killed while covering the Iraq War
Palestinian Muslims
People from Yasuf
Al Jazeera people
Palestinian reporters and correspondents
20th-century journalists